An Actor's Life For Me  is a British sitcom that aired on BBC Radio 2 from 1989 to 1993 and on BBC television in 1991. Starring John Gordon Sinclair and Gina McKee, it was written by Paul Mayhew-Archer, who later co-wrote The Vicar of Dibley.

Cast

Radio
 John Gordon Sinclair – Robert Wilson
 Caroline Quentin – Sue Bishop (Series 1 and 2)
 Gina McKee – Sue Bishop (Series 3)
 Gary Waldhorn – Desmond Shaw

Television
 John Gordon-Sinclair – Robert Neilson
 Gina McKee – Sue Bishop
 Victor Spinetti – Desmond Shaw
 Benedict Taylor – Sebastian Groom
 Sophie Dix – Stage Manager

Plot
An Actor's Life For Me is based around Robert Wilson/Neilson, an actor who believes he is about to make it big time. While he never achieves his quest for fame, he always remains optimistic that he will do at the next audition. His girlfriend, Sue Bishop, and agent Desmond Shaw do their best to keep his feet on the ground.

The final episode of the TV series ends with Sue's father (John Woodvine) being humiliated as a result of Robert's new risque play and a misunderstanding with the police. As a result of this, Sue walks out on Robert.

Television episodes
"A Kiss Is Just a Kiss" (14 November 1991)
"I Can Do That" (21 November 1991)
"Fathers and Sons" (28 November 1991)
"May the Farce Be With You" (5 December 1991)
"Night of the Living Dead" (12 December 1991)
"Not Suitable For Parents" (19 December 1991)

Radio series
An Actor's Life For Me aired on BBC Radio 2 for three series. The first series of seven episodes aired from 20 January to 3 March 1989. The second series had six episodes and ran from 11 February to 18 March 1990. The third and final series also had six episodes and ran from 5 January to 9 February 1993.  An unaired pilot had previously been recorded several years before.  It starred Nicholas Lyndhurst and Peter Jones in the roles that were subsequently played by John Gordon-Sinclair and Gary Waldhorn.

The first series was rebroadcast on BBC Radio 7 in July 2007, with a full series repeat (all 19 episodes) from April 2009 on the same network. It has subsequently been repeated several times on BBC Radio4 Extra, most recently in June 2021 (Series 1), October 2021 (Series 2) and January 2022 (Series 3).

Series 1

Ep1 – A Stiff Audition

Ep2 – I Can Do That

Ep3 – Not Suitable for Parents

Ep4 – Separate Troubles

Ep5 – Educating Robert

Ep6 – May The Farce By With You

Ep7 – Pantomime Cows

Series 2

Ep1 – The Scottish Play

Ep2 – Fathers & Sons

Ep3 – Heart Throbs

Ep4 – Up on the Roof

Ep5 – Puppets

Ep6 – Read All About it

Series 3

Ep1 – Here's looking at you

Ep2 – Politics

Ep3 – Police Farce

Ep4 – Madness in his Method

Ep5 – Fatal Distraction

Ep6 – Neighbours

References
Mark Lewisohn, "Radio Times Guide to TV Comedy", BBC Worldwide Ltd, 2003
British TV Comedy Guide for An Actor's Life For Me

External links

BBC Radio 4 Extra Programme Guide

1991 British television series debuts
1991 British television series endings
1990s British sitcoms
BBC Radio comedy programmes
BBC television sitcoms
English-language television shows